Wits and Wagers is an Xbox Live Arcade title based on the award-winning Wits and Wagers board game. The title was released on May 7, 2008. Wits and Wagers supports the Xbox Live Vision camera and Big Button Pads.

Reception

Wits and Wagers received mixed reviews from critics upon release. On Metacritic, the game holds a score of 63/100 based on 15 reviews, indicating "mixed or average reviews". On GameRankings, the game holds a score of 60.67% based on 15 reviews.

Paul Curthoys of Official Xbox Magazine awarded the game a 9/10, saying that Wits and Wagers is "a genius quiz-show game that ranks right up there with classics like You Don't Know Jack."

References

External links
Hidden Path Entertainment official site

2008 video games
Microsoft games
Party video games
Video games based on board games
Video games developed in the United States
Xbox 360 games
Xbox 360 Live Arcade games
Xbox 360-only games